is a JR West Geibi Line station located in Takatahara, Kōtachi-chō, Akitakata, Hiroshima Prefecture, Japan.

History
 April 28, 1915: Kōtachi Station opens
 April 1, 1987: Japan National Railways is privatized, and Kōtachi Station becomes a JR West station
 June 1996: The current station building is completed

Station building and platforms
Kōtachi Station features one raised island platform, capable of handling two lines simultaneously. The station building is part of the "Information Center Kōgyōkan," a building completed in 1996. The station building is operated by JA Hiroshima North. The station is located in the heart of Kōtachi-chō, and is considered a model station.

Environs
Kōtachi Post Office
Akitakata Municipal Offices, Kōtachi Branch
Akitakata Municipal Kōta Junior High School
Akitakata Municipal Kōtachi Elementary School
Akitakata Municipal Kōda Higashi Elementary School
Gōno River
Kikuyama
Mōsōbōyama
Kōrinbō (head temple of the Aki sect of Buddhism, considered a cultural treasure)

Highway access
Japan National Route 54
 Hiroshima Prefectural Route 4 (Kōda-Sakugi Route)
 Hiroshima Prefectural Route 37 (Hiroshima-Miyoshi Route)
 Hiroshima Prefectural Route 52 (Sera-Kōda Route)
 Hiroshima Prefectural Route 212 (Yoshidaguchi Teishajō Route)

Connecting lines
All lines are JR West lines. 
Geibi Line
Miyoshi Express/Miyoshi Liner
Miyoshi Station — Kōtachi Station — Mukaihara Station
Commuter Liner/Local
Kamikawatachi Station — Kōtachi Station — Yoshidaguchi Station

External links
 JR West

Geibi Line
Railway stations in Hiroshima Prefecture
Railway stations in Japan opened in 1915